Bouldercombe Gorge Resources Reserve is a scenic bushland reserve situated near the small town of Bouldercombe, near Rockhampton in Central Queensland, Australia.  The gorge cuts into the Razorback Range and Crocodile Creek runs along the gorge floor.

Originally called Crocodile Creek the area saw a small gold rush during the late 19th century.  Today, gold is still mined in Bouldercombe, but only by amateurs.  The mine still has a wide variety of gold alloys, and is a particularly good spot for alluvial.

The total area of the reserve is 39.6 km². 

Bouldercombe Gorge Resources Reserve terrain is located at an estimated elevation of 377 meters above sea level.

See also

 Protected areas of Queensland

References

Protected areas of Queensland
Rockhampton
Canyons and gorges of Queensland